Émerson Carvalho da Silva (born January 5, 1975) is a former Brazilian football player.

Playing career
Émerson played for Portuguesa for a long time. In 2000's, he played for São Paulo, Shimizu S-Pulse, Os Belenenses, Paraná, Botafogo and Ponte Preta. He retired end of 2007 season.

In 2000, Émerson played for Brazil national team in 3 matches including against Bolivia at 2002 World Cup qualification.

Club statistics

National team statistics

References

External links

1975 births
Living people
Brazilian footballers
Brazil international footballers
J1 League players
Shimizu S-Pulse players
Associação Portuguesa de Desportos players
São Paulo FC players
Associação Atlética Ponte Preta players
Brazilian expatriate footballers
Expatriate footballers in Japan
Association football defenders
People from Bauru
Footballers from São Paulo (state)